Kasenna was a video on demand company based in California that was spun off of Silicon Graphics in 2000. It was acquired by Espial in 2008.

Products 
 MediaBase: Video On Demand and NPVR server
 vFusion: manage clusters of MediaBase video servers, and content distribution
 LivingRoom: IPTV middleware
 CWM: CDN server, acquire ADI content, and distribute it to video servers and middleware servers

References

See also 
Company profile on Business Weeks site: http://investing.businessweek.com/research/stocks/private/snapshot.asp?privcapId=95554

Video on demand
Defunct software companies of the United States